"Mama (Loves a Crackhead)" is the fourth single by British rapper and songwriter Plan B, taken from his debut album Who Needs Actions When You Got Words, which was released two weeks prior to the single. "Mama (Loves a Crackhead)" was the first single to be entirely produced by Plan B himself. "Mama" was released on 10 July 2006, and it just missed out on a UK Top 40 placing, peaking at #41. The song "tells the sad story of his mother's relationship with a crack addict". The music video for "Mama (Loves a Crackhead)" was directed by Dawn Shadforth. The song samples "I Can't Go for That (No Can Do)" by Hall & Oates and a remix version featuring Hall & Oates is also featured on his Paint It Blacker mixtape.

Track listing
 CD single
 "Mama (Loves a Crackhead)" (Radio Version) – 3:59
 "Sick 2 Def" (The Early Version) (featuring The Earlies) – 3:34

 DVD single
 "Mama (Loves a Crackhead)" (Music Video) – 4:30
 "Mama (Loves a Crackhead)" (Making of the Video) - 3:00

 7" vinyl
 "Mama (Loves a Crackhead)" (Radio Version) – 3:59

 Digital download
 "Mama (Loves a Crackhead)" (Radio Version) – 3:59
 "Sick 2 Def" (The Early Version) (featuring The Earlies) – 3:34
 "Mama (Loves a Crackhead)" (Acoustic Version) – 4:13
 "Mama (Loves a Crackhead)" (Live Version) – 4:19

Personnel
 Plan B – vocals, producer

Production
 Jonathan Quarmby – co-producer, mixing
 Kevin Bacon – co-producer, mixing
 Finn Eiles – engineer
 Jimmy Robertson – engineer

Additional musicians
 Andrew Smith – guitar
 Andy Sheldrake – bass
 Cassell the Beatmaker – drums
 Harry Escott – cello

Chart performance

Release history

References

External links
 
 

Songs about mothers
2006 singles
679 Artists singles
British hip hop songs
Songs about drugs
Plan B (musician) songs
Song recordings produced by Jonathan Quarmby
Song recordings produced by Kevin Bacon (producer)
Songs written by Plan B (musician)